Break is a 2008 action drama film starring Chad Everett, Sarah Thompson, Michael Madsen and James Russo.

Plot
A terminally ill crime boss, known only as The Man, hires a hit man named Frank to carry out his own assassination as well as the assassination of The Woman he loves. When The Woman turns out to be Frank's long lost lover, he turns against The Man becoming the target himself.

Cast
 Frank Krueger as Frank 
 Sarah Thompson as The Woman
 Chad Everett as The Man
 Mackenzie Firgens as The Mysterious Brunette
 Michael Madsen as The Associate
 Charles Durning as The Wise Man
 Matthew Jones as Haiku
 James Russo as The Father
 David Carradine as The Bishop

Reception
It won Best Drama at the Action On Film International Film Festival.

References

 
 

2008 films
American action drama films
Films shot in Los Angeles
2008 action drama films
2000s English-language films
2000s American films